André Breton, may refer to:

André Breton (1896–1966), French writer and poet
André Breton (singer) (1934–1992), Quebec-born singer

See also
André le Breton (1708–1779), French publisher